The Newon Abbott Lawn Tennis Tournament a late Victorian era grass court tennis tournament staged first staged on 23 September 1878. The tournament was organised by the Newton Abbot Archery and Lawn Tennis Club, and was played at the South Devon Cricket Club Ground, Newton Abbot, Devon, England. The tournament was held until 1883.

History
The Newon Abbott Lawn Tennis Tournament was grass court tennis event first staged in September 1878. This tournament was held for six editions and appeared to have ended in 1883.  Newton Abbott Squash & Tennis Club is still in existence today.

References

Sources
 "About". www.nasquash.co.uk. Newton Abbot Squash & Tennis Club.
 Exeter and Plymouth Gazette Daily Telegrams. (9 July 1878) Plymouth, Devon, England: British Newspaper Archives.
 Nieuwland, Alex. "Tournament – Newton Abbot". www.tennisarchives.com. Tennis Archives. Retrieved 10 December 2022.

External links
 Newton Abbott Squash and Tennis Club
 South Devon Cricket Club

Defunct tennis tournaments in the United Kingdom
Grass court tennis tournaments